Dicologlossa is a genus of soles native to the tropical and subtropical eastern Atlantic Ocean.

Species
There are currently two recognized species in this genus:
 Dicologlossa cuneata (É. Moreau, 1881) (Wedge sole)
 Dicologlossa hexophthalma (E. T. Bennett, 1831) (Ocellated wedge sole)

References

Soleidae
Marine fish genera
Taxa named by Paul Chabanaud